Global Nature Fund, established in 1998, is a private non-profit foundation with the stated goal of protecting the environment. It is headquartered in Radolfzell, Germany.

The organization, which sponsors the Living Lakes Network, marks World Wetlands Day annually by designating a water body as "Threatened Lake of the Year". In 2004 it signed a Memorandum of Cooperation with Ramsar.

Threatened Lake of the Year
2004:Lake Chapala:Mexico
2005:Lake Victoria: Kenya, Tanzania and Uganda
2006:Dead Sea: Jordan, Israel and Palestine
2007:Pantanal: Brazil, Paraguay and Bolivia
2008:Mahakam Wetland: Indonesia
2009:Lake Atitlán: Guatemala
2010:Pulicat Lake:  India
2011:Laguna de Fúquene: Colombia
2012:Lake Titicaca, Peru and Bolivia
2013:Lake Winnipeg: Canada

References
 Global Nature Fund International Foundation for Environment and Nature .
 Global Nature Fund, European Water Initiative.

Footnotes

Nature conservation organisations based in Germany
Environmental organisations based in Germany
Deutscher Naturschutzring